In baseball, hot stove league is the sport's  The phrase does not denote an actual league, but instead calls up images of baseball fans gathering around a hot stove during the cold winter months, discussing their favorite baseball teams and players. During this time, players move to other teams more actively. Fans are also interested in the new season when they see the news of the transfer.

The term has also come to refer to the wave of MLB player transactions (contract negotiations, re-signings, trades, free agency, etc.) that occur between seasons. Since most free-agent signings and trades occur during the off-season, this time of significant player transactions (including rumors and speculation about possible trades), is often referred to as the hot stove league or more simply, the hot stove.

History

According to Professor James Hardy, the term hot stove league dates from nineteenth-century small town America when, during the winter, people "gathered at the general store/post office, sat around an iron pot-bellied stove, and discussed the passing parade. Baseball, along with weather, politics, the police blotter and the churches, belonged in that company". Hardy states that the term was popularly employed by sportswriters until World War II, after which rural America gave way to larger, urban centers. Baseball analysis and conversation became the province of radio and television commentators, with off-season chatter becoming less interactive and more impersonal. 

According to David Anderson, the news and coverage provided by hot stove league newspaper columnists during the first half of the 20th century, when professional football and basketball had not yet come into being, gave baseball its foothold as "the national pastime and dominant professional sport for more than half of the twentieth century". The hot stove league was especially important in the era of the reserve clause, when the only leverage a player had to receive more money or better contract provisions was to hold out from re-signing, refuse to play, or threaten to retire. During the off-season, when contract negotiations were underway, the rumors and reports were frequent, and fans kept up with the news through hot stove league chatter. The introduction of free agency reduced the importance of the hot stove league.

In the twenty-first century, the term is still used to describe the "endless discussions", speculation and predictions bandied about by "baseball fans, baseball columnists, baseball bloggers, baseball writers, baseball podcasters and baseball radio talk show hosts" to fill the time between the end of the Major League Baseball Winter Meetings and the start of spring training. The MLB Network's daily off-season show of record is called Hot Stove.

Other uses
Hot Stove League was the name of a radio segment featuring hockey chatter and analysis that was broadcast between periods on the radio show Hockey Night in Canada beginning in 1939. The segment became a pre-game series on CBC Television in the 1950s.

Hot Stove League (Korean: 스토브리그; RR: Seutobeu Ligeu; lit. Stove League) is also a 2019 South Korean television series about an underdog baseball team.

Notes

References

Sources

Further reading
 (reprinted from 1955 edition)

Baseball terminology